Hubina is a village in Belarus in the Vitebsk Region.

In the 19th century Hubina was in Lepelsk County.

Owners of Hubin were Bużycki family, Szczytt family (since 1654) and Korsak family (since 1852).

Population 
 2010 - 157 inhabitants
 1999 - 221 inhabitants

Bibliography 
Słownik Geograficzny Królestwa Polskiego i innych krajów słowiańskich, Vol. 3, p. 197.

Clan of Jastrzębiec
Lepiel District
Villages in Belarus